The Liverpool City Region is a combined authority region of England, incorporating Liverpool and neighbouring local authority boroughs of Halton, Knowsley, Sefton, St Helens, and Wirral. The region is in the historic counties of Lancashire and Cheshire. The Liverpool City Region has a population of 1.5million. However, the metropolitan reach of the city is much wider with a population of 2.2million.

Since 1 April 2014, the Liverpool City Region Combined Authority has become the top-tier administrative body for the local governance of the city region. Through the combined authority, the six districts pool their responsibilities over strategic policy areas such as economic development, transport, employment and skills, tourism, culture, housing, and physical infrastructure. No significant powers were devolved from central government.

The region's economic development is also supported by the Liverpool City Region Local Enterprise Partnership (LEP), established in 2010 as the private sector-led board comprising political and business leaders from around the city region.

History
The Liverpool city region was one of eight defined in the 2004 document Moving Forward: The Northern Way, as a collaboration between the three northern Regional Development Agencies.

On 13 March 2007, local government minister Phil Woolas announced plans to create a "cabinet" of the Leaders of the six councils (Halton, Knowsley, Liverpool, Sefton, St Helens and Wirral) in a form of regional devolution for what was termed the "Liverpool City Region". While a report in the Liverpool Daily Post newspaper on 3 June 2008 suggests a 'Super Cabinet' plan to boost economy in the city region.

In January 2009 an agreement was made that the local authorities of Halton, Knowsley, Liverpool, Sefton, St Helens and Wirral would form the Liverpool City Region, in a Multi-Area Agreement (MAA). The agreement led to a transfer, from central government, greater responsibilities in more than ten areas covering employment, skills, transport, regeneration, housing and planning. Hazel Blears, the Secretary of State for Communities and Local Government said: "Today's 'Liverpool city-region' Multi-Area Agreement will mean Merseyside's six councils will no longer have to work alone on their economy, they will work from the same blueprint with more devolved powers to deliver jobs, training, welfare support and economic resilience."

Definition
The combined authority of Liverpool City Region includes the local government districts of Liverpool, Halton, Knowsley, Sefton, St Helens and Wirral.

Some definitions of the city region include a much wider area. The now-revoked North West of England Regional Spatial Strategy, while defining the city region for "the purposes of articulating RSS policy" as covering the six local authorities, also stated that it "extends as far as Chester, Ellesmere Port and Neston and West Lancashire".  A 2011 report, Liverpool City Region - Building on its Strengths, by an independent working group led by Lord Heseltine and Terry Leahy, stated that "what is now called Liverpool City Region has a population of around 1.5million", but also referred to "an urban region that spreads from Wrexham and Flintshire to Chester, Warrington, West Lancashire and across to Southport", with a population of 2.3million. The European Union's ESPON calculated the Liverpool metropolitan area to be over 2.3million people.

Governance

Combined authority

Since the abolition of Merseyside County Council, the councils have co-operated as permitted by the Local Government Act 1972 and required by the Local Government Act 1985, for example the Merseyside Waste Disposal Authority and the Merseyside Passenger Transport Authority.  Liverpool City Region's proposal to central government for a combined authority was approved by Parliamentary statutory order in late March, and it legally came into existence from 1 April 2014. Liverpool City Region Combined Authority will become the top-tier administrative body of Liverpool City Region. It will be a body corporate responsible for strategic decision making. The six local authorities in the area constituting the combined authority will pool together powers over economic development, regeneration and transport policy. The combined authority comprises seven members: the council leaders of Halton, Knowsley, Sefton, St Helens and Wirral, the Mayor of Liverpool, and the chairperson, as the representative, of the local enterprise partnership. The proposed authority was known as the Liverpool City Region Combined Authority up until submission to the Department for Communities and Local Government and the Greater Merseyside Combined Authority in the published scheme. The consultation preceding the creation of the combined authority showed strong support for a name including 'Liverpool' rather than 'Merseyside', in order to capitalise and build upon Liverpool’s
global ‘brand’. The name was changed to the Halton, Knowsley, Liverpool, St Helens, Sefton and Wirral Combined Authority in the draft order presented to parliament. On 21 February 2014 it was decided by the constituent councils that the authority will use the public name of Liverpool City Region Combined Authority.

Local enterprise partnership
The Liverpool City Region Local Enterprise Partnership was established in 2010 and is the local enterprise partnership (LEP) for Liverpool City Region.

The LEP initiated Mersey Waters Enterprise Zone, which was set up in 2012. The enterprise zone contains two sites, Liverpool Waters and Wirral Waters.

Members of Parliament

Population 
Since its creation in 2014, the Liverpool City Region Combined Authority has a population of 1.5million which is the 4th largest Combined Authority in England.

Liverpolitan identity

'Liverpolitan' is the proposed adjective and demonym of the Liverpool City Region. In recent years as the city region has emerged and grown, the word has been used to describe a native or inhabitant of the Liverpool City Region. Its usage within this context has been both conceptualised and criticised.

In their 2011 report Rebalancing Britain: Policy or Slogan, Lord Michael Heseltine and Sir Terry Leahy considered opportunities available to grow the emerging Liverpool City Region over the following ten to twenty years. After discussions with a range of stakeholders which included Liverpool City Council, surrounding local authorities, businesses and community groups, Heseltine and Leahy recommended that “The so-called ‘Liverpolitan Diaspora’ should be provided with a formal structure and opportunity to help their home city region with investment leads, expertise, advice and intelligence.”

In 2016, the Liverpool Echo revealed that the word 'Liverpolitan' was being used to refer to anyone from anywhere in the Liverpool City Region and would tap into the growing political unity of Liverpool, Halton, Knowsley, Sefton, St Helens and Wirral. It was argued that adopting the phrase would temper existing tensions within the concerned localities and would negate the need to refer to those living on the outskirts of Liverpool with the pejorative term of 'wools' or 'woolybacks'. Mayor of Liverpool Joe Anderson argued against the idea suggesting that the term 'Scouser' was positive for the city's identity and was similar to nicknames associated with other cities and regions throughout the United Kingdom. Mayor Anderson argued that the 'Scousers versus Wools' narrative could be divisive, but should be viewed as harmless.

In 2017, shortly after the inauguration of Steve Rotheram as the first Liverpool City Region Mayor, Jonathan Heywood at City Monitor argued that Steve Rotheram's first challenge was to address Liverpool's 'out of date' boundary issues to better integrate the city with its neighbouring communities in order to present a united front. Heywood argued that opening a 'City Region Assembly' would strengthen and secure the long term role of city region mayor and the concept of 'a shared Liverpolitan project.'

In 2021, 39 elected councillors across the six districts of the Liverpool City Region were surveyed about the Liverpolitan identity. The survey revealed that most councillors in the city region did not identify with being a Liverpolitan, however, 46percent either definitely did identify with the term or were neutral about it. Most councillors were fairly sure that their ward residents would be neutral about the subject. The survey also revealed major differences between councillors who believed the term was a positive or negative statement and those who thought it should definitely be promoted or left alone. Those who did not identify with the Liverpolitan identity were more unsure overall on how to answer the various survey questions whilst those who definitely identified as Liverpolitan were generally more confident that their position was beneficial to the city region and its people.

Economy
The Liverpool City Region is strongly established as an important driving force in the economy of Northern England and as a strategic sea and air gateway to the European Union. It connects to North America, Ireland, the Isle of Man, Europe and beyond; serving international, national and regional markets, investors and visitors. In 20082010, Liverpool had the UK's fastest growing economy outside London, one of the UK's top three biomedical centres, and has the UK's second largest wealth management industry.

The city region provides some 741,000 jobs, generating GVA of £33billion.

The region is largely monocentric with Liverpool as the dominant employment centre, however economic activity is widely spread across the six districts.  Broadly speaking Liverpool is the commercial, cultural and transport hub of the region, with Sefton as the base of Seaforth Dock and tourist resort of Southport, Halton as the location for chemical, science, technology, logistics and distribution companies, and Knowsley, St Helens and Wirral providing key manufacturing and logistics for the area.  The city of Liverpool itself has a compact travel to work area reflecting its position on the North West Atlantic Seaboard and compactness of the surrounding urban area.

The city region is traditionally seen as a service sector economy, with its so called knowledge economy providing one third of the local employment base and over 40% of its total economic value. According to statistics for 2008, the Life sciences sector accounts for almost 10% of the region's economy, over 71,000 people are employed in financial and professional services, over 34,000 in manufacturing, and almost 24,000 in the creative and digital industry. The area is strongly connected to global markets, through its ports, airports and by its many multinational companies. World companies such as Barclays Wealth, Jaguar Land Rover, Maersk, Novartis, Santander, Sony and Unilever, all have a major base of operation in the locality.

Over the coming decades, the city region plans to deliver some of the UK's largest and most ambitious development and infrastructure
schemes, representing a development value in excess of £30bn.

Planned schemes include:
 Liverpool Waters
 Wirral Waters
 Liverpool 2 Container Terminal 
 Liverpool Cruise Terminal
 International Trade Centre
 Commercial District Expansion
 Round 2.5 and Round 3 Irish Sea offshore wind farms
 Enlarging existing dock system to accommodate larger vessels.
 Daresbury Science and Innovation Park
 Biomass Power Stations along the River Mersey and Manchester Ship Canal
 Environmental Technology Zone
 Mersey Gateway Bridge
 Expansion of the Mersey Multimodal Gateway (3MG)
 New Royal Liverpool University Hospital and Bio Campus
 Edge Lane Retail Park
 Transformation of North Liverpool

Transport

The Liverpool City Region has a transport network that is connected locally, nationally, and internationally by road, rail, sea and air.

Road

The region is served by a network of six motorways (M58 to the north, M56 to the south, M6 & M62 to the east and M53 to the west).  In addition, the M57 acts as an outer ring road and bypass for the city of Liverpool itself.  The area has relatively low road congestion and its central location makes it an efficient base from which to service the whole country.  Various parts of the region are separated by the River Mersey, and as a result, Wirral is connected to the centre of Liverpool via the Queensway Tunnel and Kingsway Tunnel, whereas Widnes and Runcorn are connected by the Silver Jubilee Bridge.  A second six-lane toll bridge under the name Mersey Gateway, to relieve congestion on the ageing Silver Jubilee Bridge, opened in 2017.  The bridge is designed to improve transport links between Widnes and Runcorn and other key locations in the vicinity.

Rail

Liverpool Lime Street, the region's main terminal train station, is served by five train operating companies serving a wide variety of destinations, and is used by 11.8million passengers per year. Improved rail connectivity, including upgrades to the West Coast Main Line and investment in high speed Pendolino trains, means journey time to London Euston is within two hours via Avanti West Coast. East Midlands Railway serves Norwich, Manchester, Sheffield and Nottingham. TransPennine Express operates daily services to Leeds, Middlesbrough, Hull, York, and Newcastle. Northern operates to Huddersfield, Preston, Warrington, and Blackpool, whilst direct links to Birmingham are possible via West Midlands Trains.

The sub-regional rail network is operated by Merseytravel, the combined Passenger Transport Executive and integrated transport authority for Merseyside, and public sector body responsible for the coordination of public transport across Liverpool city region, except Halton. Merseyrail is an urban rail operating almost 800 trains per day carrying over 100,000 passengers within the city region, on its network of 67 stations. The Merseyrail network includes five underground stations in Liverpool City Centre and Birkenhead centre.

The UK government has insisted that the region will benefit from Britain's new high-speed rail network, due for completion by 2032, even though the new line will not extend into the region. Journey times to London from Liverpool would be cut by 32minutes under the proposals. Pressure is being put on the government to extend high speed rail into Liverpool's city centre.

Sea
The Port of Liverpool is container ports that handles over 33milliontonnes of freight cargo per year and serves more than 100 global destinations including Africa, Australia, China, India, the Middle East and South America. Imports include grain and animal feed , timber, steel, coal, cocoa, crude oil, edible oils and liquid chemicals; and exports of scrap metal for recycling.  A second container terminal, Liverpool2 at Seaforth, was designed to handle the largest Post-Panamax vessels and doubled the port's capacity when it opened in 2016.

Almost three quarters of a million people travel on Irish Sea ferry services from Liverpool Docks and Birkenhead's Twelve Quays to Belfast, Dublin and the Isle of Man, and there is a growing number of cruise ships making day calls at the port.  A new terminal at Prince's Dock  provides check-in, baggage drop and reclaim, as well as customs and border facilities for thousands of cruise liner passengers visiting the region, whilst Peel Ports have also planned a second cruise terminal as part of the Liverpool Waters project.

The Mersey Ferry offers regular commuter services between Wirral and Liverpool City Centre, with 684,000passengers using the service in 2009–2010.

Air
Global air connectivity to and from the region is provided by two international airports, Liverpool John Lennon Airport (LJLA), and Manchester Airport. Its two main airlines easyJet and Ryanair provide  low-cost air flights to and from most major European cities, and over 70 destinations are served by the airport overall, including regular flights to the Near East and North Africa.

Almost all the air traffic is generated by low-cost scheduled carriers to short-haul destinations across Europe and there are currently no long haul services operating from the airport, however, up until 2012 Dutch airline KLM had provided a daily link to its Amsterdam hub at Schiphol which offered a feeder service to over 650 long haul routes across the globe.  Following the suspension of the service, airport bosses signalled that they will find an alternative European hub airport in the near future to continue to provide international connecting flights from Liverpool. This was later found in 2015 when Aer Lingus began direct flights to Dublin opening up routes to North America and Asia.

As part of LJLA's Master Plan, the airport is planning for substantial expansion and is forecast to handle more than 12million passengers by 2030, as well as targeting permanent direct long haul flights and significantly larger terminal facilities.

Television
The Liverpool City Region is covered by BBC North West and ITV Granada. Additionally, as of late 2013 the region is covered by local TV channel Liverpool TV.  The channel broadcasts over 35 hours of local content per week, along with a range of other content from across the network. The channel is available exclusively on Freeview channel 7 in the Liverpool City region and also nationally on Sky and Virgin TV.

See also
 Healthcare in Liverpool
 List of metropolitan areas in the United Kingdom

References

External links
Liverpool City Region Combined Authority (Official website)
Liverpool City Region Local Enterprise Partnership (LEP)

 
Combined authorities
Local enterprise partnerships
Local government in Merseyside